The men's triple jump at the 2021 World Athletics U20 Championships was held at the Kasarani Stadium on 22 August.

Records

Results

Final
The final was held on 22 August at 14:30.

References

Triple jump
Triple jump at the World Athletics U20 Championships